Allies (Music for Dance Volume 2) is a studio album by English guitarist, composer and improvisor Fred Frith. It is the second of a series of Music for Dance albums Frith made.

Background
In 1989 Frith was commissioned by choreographer Bebe Miller to write a suite of music for the Brooklyn Academy of Music's "Next Wave" series. Frith composed and recorded the suite, Allies, in October 1989 with musicians Tom Cora and George Cartwright, with whom Frith had been collaborating for a number of years. The percussion on the recording was provided by a drum machine that Frith had programmed. Allies premiered at the Brooklyn Academy of Music in November 1989.

In August 1995 Frith began preparing Allies for release on an album, but was unhappy with the computerised drumming. He asked drummer Joey Baron of Naked City (in which Frith also played bass guitar) to re-record the drum tracks (six years after the original recording was made). The resulting mix was released by RecRec Music in 1996.

Reception

In a review for AllMusic, Uncle Dave Lewis wrote: "For those who have ears to hear it, Allies will please repeatedly, and it remains one of Frith's most satisfying efforts in a long career typified by excellence."

All About Jazz reviewer James Taylor called the album "a shining example of Frith's compositional skill," noting that it "is laden with highly rhythmic and oddly timed melodies that are deconstructed and reconstructed, cut and spliced into new patterns."

George Logan of Scottish Photography commented: "What is particularly interesting to me is that the music though composed for dance in 1989, a dissatisfied Frith kept it in mind to get it perfect, to improve upon it. A lesser artist possibly wouldn't bother. The moral being, 'if it's worth doing it's worth taking the time'."

Track listing

Personnel
Fred Frith – bass guitar, guitar, violin, keyboards, drum machine, tape manipulations
Tom Cora – cello
George Cartwright – alto saxophone
Joey Baron – drums

Production
Martin Bisi – recording engineer
Benedykt Grodon – mixer
Bebe Miller – producer

Re-issues
In 2004 Fred Records issued a remastered version of the album, which Frith dedicated to Daniel Waldner: "For Daniel, with love and gratitude". Waldner was the founder of RecRec Music (Frith's record label in the 1990s) who had died in a mountain climbing accident in 1995, precipitating the collapse of the label in 1997.

References

1996 albums
Fred Frith albums
RecRec Music albums
Fred Records albums